Sofia Arvidsson and Michaëlla Krajicek were the defending champions, but chose not to compete.

Seeds

Draw

References 
 Main draw

Ritro Slovak Open - Doubles
2010 Women's Doubles